is a Japanese tarento. She is nicknamed . She is the leader of the idol group Sanspo Idol Reporter. She is represented with Sole Promotion.

Biography
Yamashita is the second daughter of three sisters. While in high school, she worked in the foundation of a local theatre company in Fukuoka. After graduating from high school Yamashita was scheduled to join to the company. It led her to have a career in Tokyo. Although becoming an actress after being passed from the audition, Yamashita wrote scripts in the theatre company because she lacked situations to act, and gained and income and sold to other companies. While working as an idol, she also worked as an MC. Yamashita's career expanded in television on 2008. From 2012 she joined activities in the idol group Sanspo Idol Reporter.

Filmography

TV series

Radio

Internet

Films

DVD

Stage

Pachinko machines

References

External links
 

Japanese television personalities
Japanese idols
1984 births
Living people
Musicians from Fukuoka Prefecture
21st-century Japanese singers
21st-century Japanese actresses
People from Fukuoka